The San Francisco Giants are a Major League Baseball franchise based in San Francisco, California. They moved to San Francisco from New York City in 1958.  They play in the National League West division. The first game of the new baseball season for a team is played on Opening Day, and being named the Opening Day starter is an honor, which is often given to the player who is expected to lead the pitching staff that season, though there are various strategic reasons why a team's best pitcher might not start on Opening Day. Through 2016, the Giants have used 30 different Opening Day starting pitchers in their 58 seasons since moving to San Francisco. The 30 starters have a combined Opening Day record of 27 wins, 16 losses and 16 no decisions. No decisions are only awarded to the starting pitcher if the game is won or lost after the starting pitcher has left the game.

The first Opening Day game for the San Francisco Giants was played against the Los Angeles Dodgers on April 15, 1958 at Seals Stadium, the Giants' first home ball park in San Francisco.  Rubén Gómez was the Giants' Opening Day starting pitcher that day, in a game the Giants lost 8–0.  That was the Giants' only Opening Day game at Seals Stadium.  They also played in two other home parks in San Francisco: Candlestick Park from 1960 to 1999, and Oracle Park, previously called PacBell Park, SBC Park and AT&T Park, since 2000.  The Giants' Opening Day starting pitchers had a record of seven wins, three losses and seven no decisions at Candlestick Park and have a record of two wins, one loss and one no decision at AT&T Park.  That gives the San Francisco Giants' Opening Day starting pitchers a total home record of 10 wins, 4 losses and 8 no decisions.  Their record in Opening Day road games is 17 wins, 12 losses, and 8 no decisions.

Juan Marichal holds the San Francisco Giants' record for most Opening Day starts, with 10. Marichal had a record in Opening Day starts of six wins, two losses and two no decisions. Tim Lincecum and Madison Bumgarner each made four Opening Day starts for the Giants, and John Montefusco, Mike Krukow, John Burkett and Liván Hernández each made three Opening Day starts. Sam Jones, Vida Blue, Rick Reuschel, Mark Gardner, Kirk Rueter, Jason Schmidt and Barry Zito have each made two Opening Day starts for the Giants. Marichal has the most wins in Opening Day starts for San Francisco, with six. Reuschel and Burkett are the only pitchers to have won more than one Opening Day start for San Francisco without a loss. Both have records in Opening Day starts of two wins and no losses. Burkett also has a no decision. Zito has the worst record for San Francisco in Opening Day starts, with no wins and two losses. Zito and Marichal have the most losses in Opening Day starts, with two apiece. Their Opening Day starting pitchers in those years were Juan Marichal in 1962, Rick Reuschel in 1989, Liván Hernández in 2002, Tim Lincecum in 2010 and 2012, and Madison Bumgarner in 2014. The Giants' Opening Day starting pitchers won four of their six Opening Day starts in those seasons, with their only loss coming in 2012 and a no decision in 2014.

Key

Pitchers

Footnotes
  Johnny Antonelli had one Opening Day start for the San Francisco Giants in 1959.  He also had three Opening Day starts for the New York Giants, in 1955, 1956 and 1957, giving him a total of four Opening Day starts for the Giants' franchise.

References
General

Specific

Opening day starters
San Francisco Giants Opening Day starting pitchers